The Amana Nature Reserve (French: Réserve naturelle nationale de l'Amana) is a nature reserve in French Guiana, France. It has been protected, because it is one of the world's largest leatherback turtle nesting site. It is part of the communes of Awala-Yalimapo and Mana.

Overview
The reserve consists of beaches, mangrove forests, swamps and savannahs.

Leatherback Sea Turtles need very specific nesting beaches, and return to the same beach every two to three years. It is an vulnerable species with a limited number of suitable beaches. The neighbouring Wia Wia Nature Reserve in Suriname was used by the turtles as well until the beach shifted resulting in the disappearance of the turtles.

The beaches at Amana were home to 5,029 to 63,294 nests between 1967 and 2005. The turtles lay their eggs between March to July, dig a hole which will contain 80 to 90 eggs. The hole is located between the high water mark and the vegetation. The baby turtles will emerge about two months later.

Other turtles who use the beach are the Green sea turtle, the Olive ridley sea turtle and occasionally the Hawksbill sea turtle.

References

External links
 Official website (in French)

Beaches of French Guiana
Environment of French Guiana
Mana, French Guiana
Nature reserves in France
Protected areas of French Guiana